Clackmannan and Eastern Stirlingshire was a parliamentary constituency in the Clackmannan area of Central Scotland. It returned one Member of Parliament (MP) to the House of Commons of the Parliament of the United Kingdom, elected by the first past the post system.

The constituency was created for the 1918 general election, and abolished for the 1983 general election, when it was replaced by the new Clackmannan constituency.

Boundaries

Following the Representation of the People Act 1948, the seat of Clackmannan and East Stirlingshire was described in 1950 as being composed of:

The Burgh of Clackmannan
Three wards of Stirlingshire, named at the time as Eastern No. 1, Eastern No. 2, and Eastern No. 3

This would continue until the seat's abolition in 1983.

Members of Parliament

Elections

Elections in the 1910s

Elections in the 1920s

Elections in the 1930s

Elections in the 1940s

Elections in the 1950s

Elections in the 1960s

Elections in the 1970s

References

Historic parliamentary constituencies in Scotland (Westminster)
Constituencies of the Parliament of the United Kingdom established in 1918
Constituencies of the Parliament of the United Kingdom disestablished in 1983
Politics of Clackmannanshire
Stirlingshire
Politics of Stirling (council area)